Charles Cathcart, 8th Lord Cathcart (1686 – 20 December 1740) was a British Army officer. Before 1732 he was known as The Honourable Charles Cathcart.

Family
He was the second son of Alan Cathcart, 7th Lord Cathcart by his wife Elizabeth, daughter of James Dalrymple, 1st Viscount of Stair. His elder brother Alan died at sea in 1699.

Career

Military career
Cathcart joined the Army at the age of seventeen, and in 1704 he commanded a company in Colonel Macartney's regiment (later disbanded) serving against the French on the frontiers of Holland. In 1706 he commanded a troop in the Scots Greys, which corps distinguished itself at the decisive Battle of Ramillies in the same year; and in 1707 he was brigade-major to the Earl of Stair. Continuing in active service, Captain Cathcart was at most of the general actions fought by the army commanded by the Duke of Marlborough, acquiring the reputation of a brave and zealous officer. In 1709 he was appointed major of the Scots Greys and shortly afterwards obtained the lieutenant-colonelcy of the regiment.

In autumn 1715, on the breaking out of the rebellion of the Earl of Mar, Cathcart joined the forces under the Duke of Argyll at Stirling. On 23 October he detached with a party of dragoons against a body of rebels consisting of one hundred horse and two hundred foot, with whom he came up at five o'clock on the following morning and attacked and defeated them, killing many and capturing seventeen prisoners. He was also at the Battle of Sheriffmuir on 13 November, in the same year, and by a prompt attack on the enemy's flank with the Scots Greys under his command, contributed materially to the overthrow of the left wing of the rebel army. He was rewarded with the colonelcy of the 9th Foot on 15 February 1717, but he only retained the appointment eleven months.

On 13 August 1728 Cathcart obtained the colonelcy of the 31st Regiment, and was removed to the 8th Dragoons on 1 January 1731. On 7 August 1733 he was made colonel of the 7th Horse (later 6th Dragoon Guards); in 1735 he was promoted to the rank of brigadier-general, and in 1739 to that of major-general. In 1740, when it was resolved to attack the Spanish possessions in America, Lord Cathcart was selected to command the expedition and was appointed commander-in-chief in America, but he died on his passage on 20 December 1740 and was buried on the beach at Portsmouth, Dominica, where a monument was erected to his memory.

At court 
On the accession of King George II in 1727 he was appointed a Groom of the Bedchamber in the royal household. In 1732 he succeeded to the title of Lord Cathcart, and he was appointed lord of the bedchamber to King George II in 1733. Lord Cathcart was chosen one of the representatives of the Scottish peerage in several parliaments, and was governor of Duncannon Fort and of Londonderry.

References

This article incorporates text from publications now in the public domain:
 Sir James Balfour Paul, The Scots Peerage, volume II (Edinburgh, 1905) pp. 518–520
 Richard Cannon, Historical Record of the Ninth, or the East Norfolk Regiment of Foot (London, 1848) pp. 118–119
 Richard Cannon, Historical Record of the Sixth Regiment of Dragoon Guards, or the Carabineers (London, 1839) pp. 97–99
 Richard Cannon, Historical Record of the Thirty-First, or the Huntingdonshire Regiment of Foot (London, 1850) pp. 216–217
 George Edward Cokayne, ed. Vicary Gibbs with H. Arthur Doubleday, The Complete Peerage, new edition, volume III (London, 1913) pp. 105–106

|-

1686 births
1740 deaths
Lords of Parliament
Scottish representative peers
British Army major generals
Royal Scots Greys officers
Royal Norfolk Regiment officers
East Surrey Regiment officers
8th King's Royal Irish Hussars officers
Carabiniers (6th Dragoon Guards) officers
British military personnel of the War of the Spanish Succession
People of the Jacobite rising of 1715
British Army personnel of the War of Jenkins' Ear